Dondre, or Dondré , is a masculine given name. Notable people with the given name include:

Dondre Gilliam (born 1977), American football player
Dondré Whitfield (born 1969), American actor
Dondre Wright (born 1994), Canadian football player

Masculine given names